Karnei Oren Memorial Field, also known as Histadrut Field (as it is located at the corner of Keren Hayesod and Histadrut streets) or Ra'anana Stadium, is a multi-use stadium in Ra'anana, Israel.  

It is used mostly for football matches. The stadium was used previously by Hapoel Ra'anana, while playing in Liga Leumit, most recently in 2012–13, and it is currently used by Bnei Ra'anana, who play in Liga Bet. The stadium was opened in 1940 and has a capacity of 2,500 spectators.

References

External links
 Stadium information
 Stadium Information @ Israeli Football Association
 Stadium Information @ imms.co.il

Football venues in Israel
Sports venues in Central District (Israel)